The Meteorological Service of Canada (MSC) is a division of Environment and Climate Change Canada, which primarily provides public meteorological information and weather forecasts and warnings of severe weather and other environmental hazards.  MSC also monitors and conducts research on the climate, atmospheric science, air quality, water quantities, ice and other environmental issues. MSC operates a network of radio stations throughout Canada transmitting weather and environmental information 24 hours a day called Weatheradio Canada.

History

Private Observations

Prior to 1840, meteorological observations in Canada were made by private individuals, other entities (like HBC), and explorers, but this information was not provided to the general public.

Her Majesty's Magnetic and Meteorological Observatory
In 1840, British officials (British Ordnance Department) and the Royal Society established an observatory in Toronto, Canada West, one of a few across the British Empire and likely modeled after the Royal Observatory, Greenwich.

Meteorological Service of the Dominion
The Toronto observatory ended in 1853, but the colonial government of the province of Canada took over the service and continued collecting climate data. On May 1, 1871, the new Dominion of Canada established the Meteorological Service of Canada by providing a $5000 grant to Professor G. T. Kingston of the University of Toronto to establish a network of weather observations. This information was collected and made available to the public from 1877 onwards. The MSC was then assigned under the Department of Marine and Fisheries.

Meteorological Division of the Air Services Branch

From 1936 to 1946 the services assigned under the Department of Transport as the Meteorological Division of the Air Services Branch and as the Meteorological Branch from 1956.

In 1939, the Meteorological Division, Air Services Branch was expanding rapidly to serve commercial aviation. In September 1939 the full-time staff of the Meteorological Division based in Toronto numbered 213, of which 51 were meteorologists and 57 were meteorological observers.

Atmospheric Environment Service and Meteorological Service of Canada

In 1971 the Canadian Meteorological Service was established under the Department of Environment (Environment Canada) in 1971. The AES was renamed later as the Meteorological Service of Canada'.

Organization 
There are currently five public weather forecast offices:

 Pacific and Yukon Storm Prediction Centre in Vancouver, British Columbia
 Prairie and Arctic Storm Prediction Centre, split between an office in Edmonton, Alberta and Winnipeg, Manitoba
 Ontario Storm Prediction Centre (Toronto)
 Quebec Storm Prediction Centre (Montreal, Quebec)
 Atlantic Storm Prediction Centre (Dartmouth, Nova Scotia). The Atlantic Storm Prediction Centre also houses the Canadian Hurricane Centre plus manages the Newfoundland and Labrador Weather Office Gander, Newfoundland and Labrador.

There are two centres dedicated to aviation weather forecasting: Canadian Meteorological Aviation Centre-East, located in Montreal, and Canadian Meteorological Aviation Centre-West, located in Edmonton.

MSC also operates the Canadian Meteorological Centre, which is tasked with providing forecast guidance, and the Canadian Ice Service, which provides ice observations and forecasts for mariners.  In support of Canada's military, some MSC meteorologists are seconded to the Department of National Defence.

The Meteorological Service of Canada was ISO9001:2000 Certified for their Hydrometric Monitoring Program.

Heads of the Observatory/MSC

 1840, Lieutenant C.J.B. Riddell, Royal Artillery
 1841, Captain J.G. Younghusband
 1841–1853, Captain Sir John Henry Lefroy
 1853–1855, Professor John Bradford Cherriman, Provisional Director of the Toronto Observatory
 1855–1880, Professor G. T. Kingston, Director of the Toronto Observatory, Superintendent of the MSC
 1880–1894, Charles Carpmael, Director
 1894–1929, Sir R. Frederick Stupart, Director
 1929–1946, John Patterson M.A. F.R.C.S., Director
 1946–1959, Andrew Thomson D.Sc., M.A. OBE, Controller of the Meteorological Division
 1959–1964, Patrick D. McTaggart-Cowan DSc LLD MBE, Director of the Meteorological Division
 1964–1971, J.R.H. Noble, Assistant Minister, Atmospheric Environment Service
 1964–1971, J.R.H. Noble, Administrator, Atmospheric Environment Service

Headquarters

 1840, Old Fort York (Bathurst Street), Toronto, Upper Canada — housed in unused barracks
 1840–1853, Kings' College, Toronto, Upper Canada/Canada West — still located at King's College Circle, University of Toronto (see Toronto Magnetic and Meteorological Observatory)
 1907–1971, Dominion Meteorological Building, 315 Bloor Street West, Toronto, Ontario — now Admissions and Awards Building, University of Toronto
 1972–present, 4905 Dufferin Street, Toronto, Ontario (by architects Boignon & Armstrong)

See also
 Canadian Hurricane Centre
 Environment and Climate Change Canada
 Canadian Meteorological Centre
 Canadian Meteorological and Oceanographic Society
 NinJo, SMC forecasting workstation software
 Forecast region
 R. E. Munn

References

External links

 Environment and Climate Change Canada weather information
 MSC Open Data documentation

 
1871 establishments in Canada
Government agencies established in 1871
Governmental meteorological agencies in North America